Ernest Trimmingham (1880–1942), often misspelled as Trimingham, was an actor on stage and screen from the British Overseas Territory of Bermuda. He was one of the first black actors in British cinema. Trimingham is a common, but exclusively white, surname in Bermuda connected with an affluent merchant family, and it is likely that Ernest adopted it when he became an actor. He was born in Bermuda in 1880, and died in England on 2 February 1942.

Filmography
The Adventures of Dick Turpin (1912), a  British and Colonial Film Company release
Jack, Sam and Pete (1919) as Pete

References

1880 births
Bermudian male actors
Black British male actors
British male film actors
British male stage actors
1942 deaths
20th-century British male actors